General Francisco J. Mujica International Airport or simply Morelia International Airport,  is an international airport in Álvaro Obregón, Michoacán, Mexico, near Morelia. The airport handles national and international air traffic of the city of Morelia.  The airport is named after the former governor of Michoacán, Francisco José Múgica. General Francisco J. Mujica International Airport is the largest in the state of Michoacan. The longest route from Morelia is to Chicago, served by Volaris and VivaAerobus, while the shortest route is Mexico City, served by Aeroméxico Connect.

One of the fastest growing airports in the country, it handled 947,100 passengers in 2020 and 1,172,700 passengers in 2022, reaching the million passenger milestone for the first time that year.

History
The airport opened in 1984 and initially only had a daily flight with a DC-9 to Mexico City. The airport has grown to become the largest in the state of Michoacán.

In the past, the airport has been served by Aero California, Aero Sudpacífico, Aeromar, Aviacsa, Avolar, Líneas Aéreas Azteca, Continental (now United), Mexicana, TAESA, and TAR.

Since May 2019, the airport has been remodeled which has resulted in an expansion of the terminal building. When completed, the check-in area will be relocated, more shops and restaurants will be added, as well as more baggage carousels and gate space.

Volaris has recently opened a crew base at the airport, to support its growing number of destinations between Morelia and cities in Mexico and the United States.

Airlines and destinations

Passengers

Destinations map

Statistics

Passengers

Busiest routes

Notes

Accidents and incidents
9 September 1978 - A de Havilland Canada DHC-6 Twin Otter of Lineas Aéreas del Centro flying scheduled service to the old Morelia Airport from Mexico City, crashed shortly after takeoff from Mexico City International Airport. There were 18 fatalities among the 21 passengers. The aircraft was also damaged beyond repair.
20 October 2002 - Aerolíneas Internacionales Flight 888, a Boeing 727-100 scheduled to fly from Morelia to León/Guanajuato, allegedly encountered 9 small, spherical UFOs prior to its 10AM takeoff roll. As reported by the crew and a witness on the ground, the sighting lasted around 10 minutes, with said objects maneuvering simultaneously. After the objects moved away, the flight was able to continue without further incident.
19 September 2010 - Aeroméxico Flight 6531, bound to Morelia from Las Vegas, suffered a fuel leak. The Boeing 737-700 returned to Las Vegas for an emergency landing. There were no fatalities among the 102 passengers.

Gallery

See also 

List of the busiest airports in Mexico

References

External links
General Francisco Mujica International Airport
 Grupo Aeroportuario del Pacífico

Airports in Michoacán